Sterrett-Hassinger House, also known as David Sterrett House, was a historic home located at Upper Mifflin Township in Cumberland County, Pennsylvania. It was built about 1789–1791, and modified between about 1830-1835 and 1850.  The house was demolished after a fire.

It was listed on the National Register of Historic Places in 1983, and delisted in 2000.

References

External links

Houses on the National Register of Historic Places in Pennsylvania
Historic American Buildings Survey in Pennsylvania
Houses in Cumberland County, Pennsylvania
National Register of Historic Places in Cumberland County, Pennsylvania